This is a list of 199 species in Bembecinus, a genus of sand wasps in the family Crabronidae.

Bembecinus species

 Bembecinus abmedius R. Bohart, 1997 i c g
 Bembecinus acanthomerus (Morice, 1911) i c g
 Bembecinus adeni (Schmid-Egger, 2004) i c g
 Bembecinus aemulus (Handlirsch, 1895) i c g
 Bembecinus agilis (F. Smith, 1873) i c g
 Bembecinus alternatus van der Vecht, 1949 i c g
 Bembecinus anatolicus de Beaumont, 1968 i c g
 Bembecinus angustifrons (Arnold, 1940) i c g
 Bembecinus anthracinus (Handlirsch, 1892) i c g
 Bembecinus antipodum (Handlirsch, 1892) i c g
 Bembecinus argentifrons (F. Smith, 1856) i c g
 Bembecinus asiaticus Gussakovskij, 1935 i c g
 Bembecinus asphaltites de Beaumont, 1968 i
 Bembecinus assentator (Arnold, 1945) i c g
 Bembecinus asuncionis (Strand, 1910) i c g
 Bembecinus ater R. Bohart, 1996 i c g
 Bembecinus atratus (Arnold, 1936) i c g
 Bembecinus barbarus (de Beaumont, 1950) i c g
 Bembecinus berlandi Willink, 1952 i c g
 Bembecinus bernardi de Beaumont, 1954 i c g
 Bembecinus bicinctus (Taschenberg, 1875) i c g
 Bembecinus bidens (Arnold, 1933) i c g
 Bembecinus bimaculatus (Matsumura and Uchida, 1926) i c g
 Bembecinus birecikensis Schmid-Egger, 2004 i c g
 Bembecinus bishoppi Krombein and Willink, 1951 i c g
 Bembecinus boer (Handlirsch, 1900) i c g
 Bembecinus borneanus (Cameron, 1903) i c g
 Bembecinus bridarollii Willink, 1949 i c g
 Bembecinus brooksi R. Bohart, 1997 i c g
 Bembecinus broomfieldi Krombein, 1984 i c g
 Bembecinus buyssoni (Arnold, 1929) i c g
 Bembecinus bytinskii de Beaumont, 1954 i c g
 Bembecinus caffer (de Saussure, 1854) i c g
 Bembecinus carinatus Lohrmann, 1942 i c g
 Bembecinus carpetanus (Mercet, 1906) i c g
 Bembecinus chilwae R. Bohart, 1997 i c g
 Bembecinus cinguliger (F. Smith, 1856) i c g
 Bembecinus clypearis R. Bohart, 1996 i c g
 Bembecinus comberi (R. Turner, 1912) i c g
 Bembecinus comechingon Willink, 1949 i c g
 Bembecinus consobrinus (Handlirsch, 1892) i c g
 Bembecinus corpulentus (Arnold, 1929) i c g
 Bembecinus crassipes (Handlirsch, 1895) i c g
 Bembecinus cyprius de Beaumont, 1954 i c g
 Bembecinus damarensis F. Gess and Pulawski, 2015 i g
 Bembecinus decoratus Guichard, 1980 i c g
 Bembecinus dentiventris (Handlirsch, 1895) i c g
 Bembecinus discolor (Handlirsch, 1892) i c g
 Bembecinus distinctus (Arnold, 1955) i c g
 Bembecinus egens (Handlirsch, 1892) i c g
 Bembecinus escalerae (R. Turner, 1912) i c g
 Bembecinus facialis (Handlirsch, 1892) i c g
 Bembecinus fertoni (Handlirsch, 1908) i c g
 Bembecinus flavipes (F. Smith, 1856) i c g
 Bembecinus flavopictus (Arnold, 1936) i c g
 Bembecinus flexuosefasciatus (Mantero, 1917) i c g
 Bembecinus floridanus Krombein & Willink, 1951 i c g b
 Bembecinus fraterculus (Arnold, 1929) i c g
 Bembecinus gariepensis F. Gess and Pulawski, 2015 i g
 Bembecinus gazagnairei (Handlirsch, 1892) i c g
 Bembecinus gilvus R. Bohart, 1997 i c g
 Bembecinus gorytoides (Handlirsch, 1895) i c g
 Bembecinus gracilicornis (Handlirsch, 1892) i c g
 Bembecinus gracilis (von Schulthess, 1893) i c g
 Bembecinus guichardi Schmid-Egger, 2004 i c g
 Bembecinus gusenleitneri de Beaumont, 1967 i c g
 Bembecinus gynandromorphus (Handlirsch, 1892) i c g
 Bembecinus haemorrhoidalis (Handlirsch, 1900) i c g
 Bembecinus haplocerus (Handlirsch, 1895) i c g
 Bembecinus hebraeus de Beaumont, 1968 i c g
 Bembecinus heinrichi Schmid-Egger, 2004 i c g
 Bembecinus helicicola Pulawski, 2015 i g
 Bembecinus henseni Schmid-Egger, 2004 i c g
 Bembecinus herbsti (Arnold, 1929) i c g
 Bembecinus hirtiusculus (Arnold, 1945) i c g
 Bembecinus hirtulus (F. Smith, 1856) i c g
 Bembecinus hoplites (Handlirsch, 1892) i c g
 Bembecinus hungaricus (Frivaldszky, 1876) i c g
 Bembecinus hyperocrus (Arnold, 1929) i c g
 Bembecinus inermis (Handlirsch, 1892) i c g
 Bembecinus inexspectatus Pulawski, 2015 i g
 Bembecinus innocens de Beaumont, 1967 i c g
 Bembecinus insulanus de Beaumont, 1954 i c g
 Bembecinus insularis (Handlirsch, 1892) i c g
 Bembecinus iranicus Schmid-Egger, 2004 i g
 Bembecinus irwini R. Bohart, 1997 i c g
 Bembecinus jacksoni (Arnold, 1955) i c g
 Bembecinus javanus (Handlirsch, 1892) i c g
 Bembecinus kachelibae (Arnold, 1960) i c g
 Bembecinus karasanus F. Gess and Pulawski, 2015 i g
 Bembecinus karooensis (Arnold, 1936) i c g
 Bembecinus khuzestani Schmid-Egger, 2004 i c g
 Bembecinus knighti Krombein, 1984 i c g
 Bembecinus kobrowi (Arnold, 1936) i c g
 Bembecinus kotschyi (Handlirsch, 1892) i c g
 Bembecinus krameri Krombein, 1984 i c g
 Bembecinus kuehlhorni Willink, 1953 c g
 Bembecinus kuelhorni Willink, 1953 i
 Bembecinus lateralis (Bingham, 1897) i c g
 Bembecinus laterimacula (Handlirsch, 1895) i c g
 Bembecinus laticaudatus (Arnold, 1929) i c g
 Bembecinus laticinctus (Arnold, 1929) i c g
 Bembecinus latifascia (Walker, 1871) i c g
 Bembecinus lavongaianus Tsuneki, 1982 i c g
 Bembecinus littoralis van der Vecht, 1949 i c g
 Bembecinus lomii (Guiglia, 1941) i c g
 Bembecinus loriculatus (F. Smith, 1856) i c g
 Bembecinus luteolus Krombein, 1984 i c g
 Bembecinus maior (Handlirsch, 1895) i c g
 Bembecinus manusensis Tsuneki, 1982 i c g
 Bembecinus mattheyi (de Beaumont, 1951) i c g
 Bembecinus mayri (Handlirsch, 1892) i c g
 Bembecinus meridionalis A. Costa, 1859 i c g
 Bembecinus mexicanus (Handlirsch, 1892) i c g
 Bembecinus mhamidus Schmid-Egger, 2004 i c g
 Bembecinus mirus (Arnold, 1945) i c g
 Bembecinus mitulus (Arnold, 1929) i c g
 Bembecinus modestus (F. Smith, 1860) i c g
 Bembecinus moneduloides (F. Smith, 1856) i c g
 Bembecinus monodi (Berland, 1950) i c g
 Bembecinus monodon (Handlirsch, 1895) i c g
 Bembecinus multiguttatus (Arnold, 1951) i c g
 Bembecinus mutabilis (Arnold, 1929) i c g
 Bembecinus naefi (de Beaumont, 1951) i c g
 Bembecinus namaquensis Pulawski, 2015 i g
 Bembecinus nambui Tsuneki, 1973 i c g
 Bembecinus namibicus R. Bohart, 1997 i c g
 Bembecinus namibius Pulawski, 2015 i g
 Bembecinus nanus (Handlirsch, 1892) i c g
 Bembecinus neglectus (Cresson, 1873) i c g b
 Bembecinus nemoralis (Arnold, 1960) i c g
 Bembecinus niehuisi Schmid-Egger, 2004 i c g
 Bembecinus nigriclypeus (Sonan, 1928) i c g
 Bembecinus nigrolabrum Schmid-Egger, 2004 i c g
 Bembecinus novabritanicus Tsuneki, 1982 i c g
 Bembecinus nyamadanus Tsuneki, 1974 i c g
 Bembecinus nyasae (R. Turner, 1912) i c g
 Bembecinus omaruru Pulawski, 2015 i g
 Bembecinus oxydorcus (Handlirsch, 1900) i c g
 Bembecinus paiwanus Tsuneki, 1977 i c g
 Bembecinus pakhuisae R. Bohart, 1997 i c g
 Bembecinus pallidicinctus van der Vecht, 1949 i c g
 Bembecinus papuanus (Cameron, 1906) i c g
 Bembecinus penpuchiensis Tsuneki, 1968 i c g
 Bembecinus peregrinus (F. Smith, 1856) i c g
 Bembecinus philippinensis Tsuneki, 1992 i c g
 Bembecinus podager (de Beaumont, 1951) i c g
 Bembecinus polychromus (Handlirsch, 1895) i c g
 Bembecinus posterus (Sonan, 1928) i c g
 Bembecinus priesneri Schmid-Egger, 2004 c g
 Bembecinus prismaticus (F. Smith, 1858) i c g
 Bembecinus proteus (Arnold, 1929) i c g
 Bembecinus proximus (Handlirsch, 1892) i c g
 Bembecinus pulchellus (Mercet, 1906) i c g
 Bembecinus pusillus (Handlirsch, 1892) i c g
 Bembecinus quadratus Tsuneki, 1976 i c g
 Bembecinus quadristrigatus (Arnold, 1929) i c g
 Bembecinus quinquespinosus (Say, 1823) i c g b
 Bembecinus rectilateralis (Arnold, 1945) i c g
 Bembecinus remanei Schmid-Egger, 2004 i c g
 Bembecinus reticulatus Tsuneki, 1976 i c g
 Bembecinus reversus (F. Smith, 1856) i c g
 Bembecinus revindicatus (W. Schulz, 1906) i c g
 Bembecinus rhodius de Beaumont, 1960 i c g
 Bembecinus rhopaloceroides (Arnold, 1929) i c g
 Bembecinus rhopalocerus (Handlirsch, 1895) i c g
 Bembecinus rozenorum R. Bohart, 1997 i c g
 Bembecinus ruficaudus R. Bohart, 1997 c g
 Bembecinus schlaeflei Schmid-Egger, 2004 i c g
 Bembecinus schwarzi de Beaumont, 1967 i c g
 Bembecinus semperi (Handlirsch, 1892) i c g
 Bembecinus signatus (Handlirsch, 1892) i c g
 Bembecinus simillimus (F. Smith, 1859) i c g
 Bembecinus sipapomae (Arnold, 1929) i c g
 Bembecinus solitarius (Arnold, 1936) i c g
 Bembecinus somalicus (Arnold, 1940) i g
 Bembecinus spinicornis (de Saussure, 1887) i c g
 Bembecinus spinifemur (de Beaumont, 1951) i c g
 Bembecinus stevensoni (Arnold, 1936) i c g
 Bembecinus strenuus (Mickel, 1918) i c g
 Bembecinus suada (F. Smith, 1865) i
 Bembecinus suadus (F. Smith, 1865) c g
 Bembecinus sudanensis (Arnold, 1951) i c g
 Bembecinus tanoi Tsuneki, 1971 i c g
 Bembecinus tenellus (Klug, 1845) i c g
 Bembecinus tinkeri R. Bohart, 1997 i c g
 Bembecinus trichionotus (Cameron, 1913) i c g
 Bembecinus tridens (Fabricius, 1781) i c g
 Bembecinus turneri (Froggatt, 1917) i c g
 Bembecinus urfanensis Schmid-Egger, 2004 i c g
 Bembecinus validior Gussakovskij, 1952 i c g
 Bembecinus veniperdus Lohrmann, 1942 i c g
 Bembecinus versicolor (Handlirsch, 1892) i c g
 Bembecinus wenzeli R. Bohart, 1997 i c g
 Bembecinus wheeleri Krombein and Willink, 1951 i c g
 Bembecinus witzenbergensis (Arnold, 1929) i c g
 Bembecinus yemenensis Schmid-Egger, 2009 i c g
 Bembecinus zebratus R. Bohart, 1997 i c g
 Bembecinus zibanensis (Morice, 1911) i c g

Data sources: i = ITIS, c = Catalogue of Life, g = GBIF, b = Bugguide.net

References

Bembecinus